Bjørn Thomassen (born 1968) is an anthropologist and social scientist. He is associate professor at Roskilde University in the Department of Society and Globalisation. From 2003-2012 he worked at The American University of Rome, where he was chair of the department of International Relations.

Education
Thomassen holds BA and MA degrees in Anthropology from the Institute of Anthropology at the University of Copenhagen (1994 and 1997) and a Doctoral Degree (Ph.D.) in Political and Social Science from the Department of Political and Social Sciences (2001), at the European University Institute, Florence, Italy. After his PhD he worked as a post-doctoral researcher at the University College of Cork, Ireland.

Research
Thomassen's scholarly work develops across the disciplines of anthropology, sociology, politics, philosophy and history. His research has been published in a variety of social science journals, including Anthropological Theory, Journal of the Royal Anthropological Institute, Comparative Studies in Society and History, Europæa, Journal des Europeanistes, Journal of Modern Italian Studies, etc. He has written non-scholarly articles for the Danish weekly, Weekendavisen.

His PhD research related to the anthropology of political borders, with ethnographic focus on the border region between Italy, Slovenia and Croatia known as the “Julian Region”. He examined how cultural and national identities are constructed through conflicting collective memories in a political and cultural environment defined by historically changing borders. He wrote his PhD thesis as a narrative evolving from the life-stories of self-identified Italians from Istria who for various reasons chose to leave Tito's Yugoslavia and moved “back” to Italy.

After his PhD, Thomassen has engaged various areas of research. He writes and publishes on immigration in Italy. Together with colleagues James Walston and Isabella Clough-Marinaro he has organized several conferences on immigration and integration in Italy. In this context he is also engaged in various community projects, including a project launched by the American University of Rome in 2011 to foster immigrant leadership in Italy.

Thomassen also teaches and does research related to urban anthropology. In 2010 he co-organized a conference at the AUR in Rome, called “Changing Faces of the Eternal City”, which brought together leading Italian and international scholars dedicated to the study of contemporary Rome.

Thomassen is principally interested in how anthropological ideas and approaches can inform political and social theory and the study of contemporary politics. He has in several publications explored the concept of liminality and its potential for understanding change and transition in modern societies. In an article from 2012, “From Liminal to Limivoid: Understanding contemporary Bungee Jumping in a cross-cultural perspective”, co-authored with his cross-cousin Maja Balle, he coined the term “limivoid” to denote liminal experiences that are essentially void of experiential substance and transformative potential. Elaborating Victor Turner's notion of the “liminoid”, he argued that the “limovoid” critically identifies an underlying aspect of the larger (post)modern celebration of boundary experiences.

In recent work Thomassen has sought to develop an anthropological approach to political revolutions. Thomassen has also engaged the axial age debate from the perspective of anthropology.

This relates to Thomassen's approach to the larger discussion over “multiple modernities”.
Another branch of Thomassen's teaching and research focuses on the question of social memory and identity politics. With reference to Italy, he discusses how the past is continuously but variously used in the articulation of people's urban, regional, national and European identities. He employs anthropological approaches to history and politics as produced and reproduced through memory politics via rituals, symbols and collective commemorations. Part of this research is developed with Italian historian, Rosario Forlenza.

Together with former student, Derrick Fiedler, Thomassen has revisited the work of Arnold Toynbee and argued for its contemporary relevance. In an article from 2012, Thomassen critically engaged the political philosophy of John Rawls, arguing from a perspective inspired by political theorist, Eric Voegelin. Via participation in the yearly held “Socrates Symposium” in Florence, Thomassen has also taken an interest in Plato's philosophy.

His current research in Denmark involves the history of anthropological thought, and the connections between anthropological and social theory. In an article from 2011, co-authored with Arpad Szakolczai, he argued that Gabriel Tarde should be recognized as a founding figure of political anthropology.

Thomassen is a founding editor-in-chief of the peer-reviewed academic journal International Political Anthropology.

Teaching career
Thomassen taught a broad spectrum of classes at AUR. These included areas such as: anthropology, history, sociology, and politics. Within the framework of International Political Anthropology he co-organises the annual International Political Anthropology Summer School in Florence. This course was designed for post-graduates that work in the cross-roads between anthropology and political affairs. His career includes over ten years of experience in teaching and student advising at institutions in Europe including the University of Copenhagen.

See also 
 Liminality

References

External links 
 Roskilde Webpage
 The American University of Rome
 International Political Anthropology

University of Copenhagen alumni
Danish anthropologists
Living people
1968 births
European University Institute alumni